Post miserabile was a crusading bull issued by Pope Innocent III on 15 August 1198 calling for the Fourth Crusade in the Holy Land. More than any other crusading bull, it was not issued in response to any single event, such as setback in the East, but was more organisational in tone, foreshadowing the bureaucratic and administrative changes Innocent would make to the crusading institutions.

Background 

Upon Innocent's accession to the papacy in 1198, the preaching of a Fourth Crusade became one of the goals of his pontificate. Both the kings of England and France were at war, and several other states did not heed the pontiff's call to take up arms for a crusade. Knowing that most European monarchs were preoccupied with their own affairs of state, the purpose of Post miserabile was to settle their disputes and focus attention on the East.

One of the techniques used by Innocent to ensure action is to report alleged Muslim taunts against the kings of France and England:

The bull also called for a revival of religious enthusiasm for a crusading throughout Europe.

Outline of the bull 

The bull begins by describing the present plight in the Holy Land, before going on to criticise Europe's rulers for their inability to act:

The bull then appoints Cardinals Sofferdo and Peter Capuano as special assistants in preaching and organising the crusade, specifically encouraging them to target the kings of England and France to assist.

Post miserabile also gives a great deal of organisational instructions how the crusade is to be run and established. In an attempt to encourage a revival in crusading, the bull goes into some detail concurring the privileges and benefits that could be had from undertaking to go to the Holy Land The bull was instrumental in establishing a basis for the crusade and due to the preaching of Fulk of Neuilly, a crusading army was finally organised at a tournament held at Écry-sur-Aisne by Count Thibaut of Champagne in 1199.

Notes and references

Notes

References

Fourth Crusade
12th-century papal bulls
12th-century Christian texts
12th-century Catholicism
Middle Ages Christian texts
12th-century documents
1198 in Europe
Documents of Pope Innocent III